Clara Elizabeth Chan Lee (October 21, 1886 – October 5, 1993) was the first Chinese American woman to register to vote in the United States. She registered to vote on November 8, 1911 in California following the passage of Proposition 4 in California, nine years before the passage of the Nineteenth Amendment to the United States Constitution.

Political activities
Lee registered to vote at the Alameda County courthouse on November 8, 1911.
Lee was a founder of the Chinese Women's Jeleab (self reliance) Association, created in 1913. The association promoted women's rights in both the U.S. and China. She was a member of the YWCA and the Fidelis Coterie club.

Personal life 
Clara Elizabeth (Yee Miew) Chan was born October 21, 1886 in Portland, Oregon. She was the daughter of the Methodist Reverend Chan Hon Fun (Chan Hon Fan) and Ow Muck Gay. The Rev. Chan Hon Fun was the pastor of the Chinese Community Methodist Church of Oakland in Oakland Chinatown from 1900 to 1909. Lee was married to Charles Goodall Lee, the first licensed Chinese American dentist in the United States. She died October 5, 1993 in Alameda, California and is interred in Oakland.

See also 

List of democracy and elections-related topics
List of suffragists and suffragettes
Timeline of women's suffrage in California
Women's suffrage
Women's suffrage in California

References

Further reading

Yung, Judy (1995). "Unbound Feet, A Social History of Chinese Women in San Francisco". University of California Press
 Armentrout, Eve and Ma, Jeong Huei (1982). "The Chinese of Oakland, Unsung Builders".
 Wong, William (2004). "Images of America, Oakland's Chinatown". Arcadia Press.
"Chinese Weds a White Woman" (regarding Rev. Chan Hon Fan) from The San Francisco Call, February 26, 1901

Chinese-American history
1886 births
1993 deaths
History of voting rights in the United States
History of Methodism
American centenarians
People from Alameda, California
Activists from Oakland, California
American suffragists
Activists from Portland, Oregon
Women centenarians
California suffrage